Rudolph Martin Anderson (June 30, 1876 – June 21, 1961) was an American born Canadian zoologist and explorer.

Early life
He was born in Decorah, Iowa in 1876, the son of John E. A. Anderson. He received a Ph.D. from the University of Iowa in 1906; his dissertation was entitled, The birds of Iowa.

Military service 
He was a veteran of the Spanish–American War, serving as a corporal in the 52nd Iowa Volunteer Infantry.  He served with the 54th Infantry National Guard of Iowa from 1900 to 1906.  He was a captain with the National Guard of Missouri from 1906 to 1908.

Civilian career
Anderson participated in the Stefansson-Anderson Arctic Expedition which explored Alaska and the northern Yukon from 1908 to 1912 and was part of the Canadian Arctic Expedition led by Vilhjalmur Stefansson from 1913 to 1916.

Anderson joined the Explorers Club in New York in 1912, but resigned six years later.

He assisted in the development of the Migratory Birds Convention signed by Canada and the United States in 1916. He was chief of the Biology Division of the National Museum of Canada from 1920 to 1946.

Death and legacy
He died in Ottawa in 1961.

Partial works
 (1897). An annotated list of the birds of Winnebago and Hancock counties, Iowa, 
 (1913–18). Report of the Canadian Arctic Expedition 1913–18, 
 (1917). Canadian Arctic Expedition. I. Report of Northern division. II. Report of Southern division,, 
 (1921). John Macoun, 1832 [i.e. 1831]-1920, 
 (1932). Methods of collecting and preserving vertebrate animals, 
 (1934). Mammals of the eastern Arctic and Hudson Bay ; Arctic flora, 
 (1937). Mammals and birds of the western Arctic district, Northwest Territories, Canada, 
 (1937). Faunas of Canada, 
 (1943). A synopsis of the rodents of the southern parts of the prairie provinces of Canada,

Honors 
Spanish–American War Medal
Expert Rifleman with bars
King George VI Coronation medal
Knight Officer International Order, St. Hubert, 1951

See also 
 Rudolf Martin (disambiguation)

Archives
There is a Rudolph Martin Anderson fonds at Library and Archives Canada. Archival reference number is R6390.

References

Bibliography

External links
 Rudolph Martin Anderson at The Canadian Encyclopedia
 Profile of Dr. Anderson from Canadian Museum of Civilization online exhibition of the Canadian Arctic Expedition 1913-1916

1876 births
1961 deaths
Canadian explorers
People from Decorah, Iowa
American expatriates in Canada
20th-century Canadian zoologists